The 2012 CIS football season began on August 31, 2012 with the Saskatchewan Huskies hosting the Alberta Golden Bears at Griffiths Stadium. The season concluded on November 23 in Toronto, Ontario with the 48th Vanier Cup championship, won by the Laval Rouge et Or after they defeated the McMaster Marauders 37-14. This year, 26 university teams in Canada are scheduled to play Canadian Interuniversity Sport football, the highest level of amateur Canadian football.

Regular season standings

Top 10

Championships 
The Vanier Cup is played between the champions of the Mitchell Bowl and the Uteck Bowl, the national semi-final games. In 2012, according to the rotating schedule, the Atlantic conference Loney Bowl champions (Acadia Axemen) met the Dunsmore Cup Quebec championship team (Laval Rouge et Or) for the Uteck Bowl. The Laval Rouge et Or defeated the Acadia Axemen in this game. The winners of the Canada West conference Hardy Trophy (Calgary Dinos) visited the Ontario conference's Yates Cup champion (McMaster Marauders) for the Mitchell Bowl. The Laval Rouge et Or defeated the McMaster Marauders 37-14 in the Vanier Cup to earn their seventh title.

Playoff bracket

Post-Season Awards

All-Canadian Team 

 First Team 
Offence
 Kyle Quinlan, QB, McMaster
 Garrett Sanvido, RB, Western
 Steven Lumbala, RB, Calgary
 Kit Hillis, WR, Saskatchewan
 Nick Anapolsky, WR, Waterloo
 Jordan Brescacin, IR, Windsor
 Michael Squires, IR, Acadia
 Pierre Lavertu, C, Laval
 Kirby Fabien, OT, Calgary
 Laurent Duvernay-Tardif, OT, McGill
 Jason Medeiros, G, McMaster
 Brett Jones, G, Regina
Defence
 David Rybinski, DT, Saskatchewan
 Daryl Waud, DT, Western
 Ben D'Aguilar, DE, McMaster
 Jean-Samuel Blanc, DE,  Montreal
 Aram Eisho, LB, McMaster
 Frédéric Plesius, LB, Laval
 Mathieu Masseau, SAM, Laval
 Teague Sherman, FS, Manitoba
 Tijani Chase-Dunawa, HB, Queen's
 Kirby Kezama, HB, Regina
 Jamir Walker, CB, Regina
 Joey Cupido, CB, McMaster
Special Teams
 Kyle Graves, P, Acadia
 Tyler Crapigna, K, McMaster
 Nic Demski, RET, Manitoba
 Second Team 
Offence
 Kyle Graves, QB, Acadia
 Anthony Coombs, RB, Manitoba
 Ryan Granberg, RB, Queen's
 Shaq Johnson, WR, McGill
 Taylor Renaud, WR, Acadia
 Chris Dobko, IR, Calgary
 Robert Babic, IR, McMaster
 Quinn McCaughan, C, Calgary
 Matt Sewell, OT, McMaster
 Christopher Mercer, OT, Regina
 Charles Vaillancourt, G, Laval
 Colin Murray, G, Acadia
Defence
 Jacob LeBlanc, DT, Mount Allison
 John Miniaci, DT, Queen's
 Arnaud Gascon-Nadon, DE, Laval
 Rob Jubenville, DE, Saint Mary's
 Sam Sabourin, LB, Queen's
 Brett Hubbeard, LB, St Francis Xavier
 Steve Famulak, LB, Regina
 Michael Daly, FS, McMaster
 Antoine Pruneau, HB, Montreal
 Cameron Wade, HB, Acadia
 Kayin Marchand-Wright, CB, Saint Mary's
 Fode Yansane, CB, Montreal
Special Teams
 Chris Bodnar, P, Regina
 Johnny Mark, K, Calgary
 Kris Robertson, RET, Concordia

Teams

References

2012 in Canadian football
U Sports football seasons